The 2010–11 season was PAOK Football Club's 85th in existence and the club's 52nd consecutive season in the top flight of Greek football. The team entered the Greek Football Cup and also competed in the UEFA Champions League starting from the third qualifying round.

Players 

'For recent transfers, see List of Greek football transfers summer 2010'

Out on loan

International players

Players in and out

In 

Total spending:  0

Out

Club

Management

Kit

Pre-season

Competitions

Overview

Managerial statistics

Super League Greece

League table

Results summary

Results by round

Matches

Play-offs

Matches

Greek Football Cup

Fourth round

Fifth round

Quarter-finals

Semi-finals

UEFA Champions League

Third qualifying round

PAOK advances to the UEFA Europa League play-off round as losers of the Champions league third qualifying round.

UEFA Europa League

Play-off round

Group stage

Group D

Knockout round

Round of 32

Statistics

Squad statistics

! colspan="15" style="background:#DCDCDC; text-align:center" | Goalkeepers
|-

! colspan="15" style="background:#DCDCDC; text-align:center" | Defenders
|-

! colspan="15" style="background:#DCDCDC; text-align:center" | Midfielders
|-

! colspan="15" style="background:#DCDCDC; text-align:center" | Forwards
|-

|}

Goalscorers

Disciplinary record

References

PAOK FC seasons
PAOK